Norwell High School may refer to:
Norwell High School (Indiana) - Wells County, Indiana
Norwell High School (Massachusetts) - Norwell, Massachusetts